

Close-Up Inc.
1950–1952
 Darling Love #1–11 (1949–1952)
 Darling Romance #1–7 (1949–1951)
 Sam Hill, Private Eye #1–6 (1950–1952)

Archie Adventure Series
1959–1966
 Adventures of the Fly #1–31 (August 1959 – October 1964; May 1965)
 Adventures of the Jaguar #1–15 (September 1961 – November 1963)
 Double Life of Private Strong #1–2 (June – August 1959)
 Jughead's Fantasy #1–3 (August – December 1960)
 Shadow #1–8 (August 1964 – September 1965)
 Tales Calculated to Drive You Bats #1–7 (November 1961 – November 1962), plus Giant #1 (1966)

1988–1995
 The Adventures of Bayou Billy #1–5 (September 1989 – June 1990)
 Mighty Mutanimals limited series #1–3 (May – July 1991)
 Mighty Mutanimals #1–9 (April 1992 – June 1993)
 Teenage Mutant Ninja Turtles Adventures #1–72 (August 1988 – October 1995)

Radio Comics/Mighty Comics Group
1965–1967
 Fly-Man #32–39 (July 1965 – September 1966), previously The Adventures of the Fly
 Mighty Comics #40–50 (November 1966 – October 1967), numbering continued from Fly-Man
 Mighty Crusaders #1–7 (November 1965 – October 1966)
 Super Heroes vs. Super Villains #1 (July 1966), all reprints

Red Circle Comics (original)
1973–1979
 Archie's Super Hero Special (January 1979)
 Archie's Super Hero Comic Digest Magazine #2 (1979)
 Chilling Adventures in Sorcery #3–5 (October 1973 – February 1974), continues to Red Circle Sorcery
 Mad House #95–97 (September 1974 – January 1975)
 Red Circle Sorcery #6–11 (April 1974 – February 1975); #6, 7, and 10 featured stories by T. Casey Brennan
 Super Cops #1 (July 1974)

1983–1984
 The Black Hood #1–3 (June – October 1983)
 Blue Ribbon Comics #1–14 (November 1983 – December 1984)
 The Comet #1–2 (October – December 1983), was to be a 6-issue mini-series
 The Fly #1–9 (May 1983 – October 1984)
 Katy Keene Special #1 (September 1983); continued under Archie Romance Series imprint
 Lancelot Strong: The Shield #1–7 (June 1983 – July 1984); with issue #3 (Dec. 1983), retitled Shield-Steel Sterling; with issue #4 (Jan. 1984), retitled Steel Sterling
 ManTech Robot Warriors #1–4 (September 1984 – April 1985)
 Mighty Crusaders #1–13 (March 1983 – September 1985)
 Original Shield #1–4 (April 1984 – October 1984)

Archie Action
1993–present
 Knuckles Archives #1–4 (September 2011 - April 2013)
 Knuckles the Echidna #1–32 (August 1997 – February 2000), spin–off of Sonic the Hedgehog
 Mega Man #1–55 (April 2011 – December 2015), indefinite hiatus
 Sonic Archives #1–24 (November 2006 - February 2015)
 Sonic Boom #1–11 (October 2014 – September 2015)
 Sonic the Hedgehog #1–290 (July 1993 – December 2016)
 Sonic Select #1-10 (May 2008 – January 2015)
 Sonic Universe #1–94 (February 2009 – January 2017)
 Sonic X #1–40 (September 2005 – January 2009)

Stan Lee Comics
2012
 Stan Lee's Mighty 7 #1–3 (March 2012 – September 2012)

Red Circle Comics (revival)
2012–2014
All issues were released digitally. Print copies were released after the story arc had ended.
 The Fox #1–5 (October 2013 – March 2014), limited series, character later reappeared under the Dark Circle Comics imprint.
 New Crusaders #1–6 (September 2012 – March 2013)
 New Crusaders: Legacy #1 (July 2013)

Archie Horror

2013–present
 Afterlife with Archie (October 2013 – present)
 Chilling Adventures of Sabrina (October 2014 – present)
 Jughead: The Hunger (October 2017 – present)
 Vampironica (March 2018 – present)
 Blossoms 666 (January 2019–present)
 Jughead: The Hunger vs. Vampironica (April 10, 2019)

Dark Circle Comics

2015–present
 The Black Hood #1–11 (February 2015 — June 2016)
 The Black Hood: Season 2 #1–5 (October 2016 – June 2017), a continuation of The Black Hood.
 The Fox #1–5 (April 2015 — August 2015)
 The Hangman #1–4 (November 2015 – October 2016)
 New Crusaders: Dark Tomorrow Special #1 (March 2015), one-shot featuring the Red Circle Comics versions of the characters.
 Sam Hill: In The Crosshairs (October 2015), a graphic novel released digitally featuring former NYPD detective Sam Hill.
 The Shield #1–4 (October 2015 – November 2016)

Archie Comics publications